ONElist was a free mailing list service created by Mark Fletcher in August 1997.  In November 1999 ONElist merged with eGroups. In June 2000 eGroups was purchased by Yahoo!.

External links

Electronic mailing lists
Discontinued Yahoo! services
Products introduced in 1997